William Westwood Lockyer (born May 8, 1941) is a retired American politician from California, who held elective office from 1973 to 2015, as State Treasurer of California, California Attorney General, and President Pro Tempore of the California State Senate.

Early life and education
Lockyer attended the University of California, Berkeley, graduating with a B.A. in Political Science in 1965. The following year, he received a Teaching Credential from CSU in Hayward, then worked for his father's roofing company and as a fork-lift driver at Ward's before getting his first job with the Legislature on the staff of Assemblyman Robert W. Crown. In 1986, Lockyer graduated with a J.D. from University of the Pacific McGeorge School of Law. (He returned to the classroom in 2009 as a non-tenured college professor, teaching undergraduate courses in American State Politics at the University of Southern California and the University of California at Irvine.) With his early legislative experience, Lockyer began his own political career as a School Board member of the San Leandro Unified School District, as chair of the Alameda County Democratic Central Committee, and California coordinator of Senator George McGovern's 1972 campaign for the Presidency.

Personal life
Lockyer, who lives in Hayward and Long Beach, California, was married in April 2003 to public service attorney Nadia Lockyer, a former Alameda County Supervisor, with whom he has three children, a twelve-year-old son, and two twin sons, born in December 2015. By an earlier marriage, he also has an adult daughter who is an attorney at the National Aeronautics and Space Administration (NASA).

Legislative career
Lockyer first won a State Assembly seat in a Special Election of September 4, 1973, following the accidental death of his political mentor, Bay Area Assemblyman Robert W. Crown. He served in the legislature for the next twenty-five years, more than half that time in the state senate, where, in 1994, he was chosen by his peers to be President Pro Tem, the most powerful position of the upper legislative house.

In his spare time, Lockyer attended law school classes in Sacramento and received a Juris Doctor degree from the McGeorge School of Law, University of the Pacific.

As legislator, Lockyer won close friends on both sides of the partisan aisle, including Jim Brulte, Republican Minority Leader of the state senate, who would long remember Lockyer's skill at compromise and consensus-building., and Democratic Speaker of the Assembly Willie Brown, who recalled that, by the time Lockyer left the legislature in 1998, "Capitol insiders took his prolific effectiveness for granted."

Environmental protection legislation and the Bay Trail
As a freshman legislator in 1974, Lockyer wrote the first legislation to provide state funding for emergency oil spill decontamination. During his legislative career, as a close ally of environmental pressure groups like the Sierra Club and the Planning and Conservation League, he wrote other environmental laws, including the first state regulation of trucks hauling toxic substances on California roads and highways, which preceded federal policies adopted by the EPA.

Lockyer considered his greatest environmental achievement to be his 1987 bill to create a Bay Trail, which he envisioned as an eventual 500-mile-long hiking and cycling path, a continuous recreational corridor, with adjacent bayshore parks and protected natural habitats, that would entirely encircle San Francisco and San Pablo Bays. Requiring city, county and regional cooperation, the Bay Trail marked its 20th year in 2009 with 293 miles so far open to hikers, bicyclists, joggers and walkers. As nominal "father" of the Bay Trail, a segment of the shoreline had been named in Lockyer's honor.

1984 "hate crimes" legislation
In 1984, Lockyer sponsored the State's first "hate crimes" legislation which, as later amended, provided that "no person...shall by force or threat of force, willfully injure, intimidate, interfere with, oppress, or threaten any other person in the free exercise or enjoyment of any right or privilege secured to him or her by the Constitution or laws of this state or by the Constitution or laws of the United States because of the other person's race, color, religion, ancestry, national origin, disability, gender, or sexual orientation, or because he or she perceives that the other person has one or more of those characteristics." Later, as Attorney General, Lockyer was responsible for coordinating enforcement of this statute by local law enforcement.

1987 tort reform "napkin deal"
On September 10, 1987, while Lockyer chaired the State Senate Judiciary Committee, he and Speaker of the Assembly Willie Brown met at Frank Fat's Restaurant in Sacramento with representatives of bitterly competing special interests – insurance companies, trial lawyers, doctors and manufacturers – to formalize their agreement to "the most sweeping changes in California's civil liability laws in decades". After many days of painstaking negotiations, these warring interests had accepted a compromise bill that included "a drastic restriction in product liability laws offset by fee increases for lawyers prosecuting medical malpractice cases. Doctors got promises that protections already in place against lawsuits would not be touched. Insurance companies won a reprieve from threatened regulations gaining momentum in the Legislature." This compromise had already been worked out; the dinner was meant to ratify a future "peace pact" among all the concerned parties to abide by the compromise. Lockyer, who had acted as mediator during the earlier negotiations, scribbled the terms of the 
"pact" on a restaurant cloth napkin, and so ended a political war. The compromise bill was then ramrodded through the assembly and state senate on the last night of that year's legislative session, and was signed into law by Republican governor George Deukmejian.

Though it was only Lockyer's "theatrical touch" of writing the agreement on a napkin that made it especially memorable, the "napkin deal" became legendary in the State Capitol. Proudly reproducing the original napkin on a poster titled "Tort-Mania 1987", Lockyer and Brown regarded the special interests compromise and conciliation they had arranged as a great legislative accomplishment. "The public is better served", Lockyer said at the time, "when these groups are trying to mend rather than tear the fabric of society".

1997–98 "Welfare Reform" Budget and tax-cut "Mega-deal"
Federal legislation signed by President Clinton in 1996 required California to enact “welfare-to-work” legislation to help welfare recipients move from government assistance to employment and “self-sufficiency”. The resulting establishment of a new CalWORKs (California Work Opportunity and Responsibility to Kids) program had a major effect on the state budget, propelling difficult negotiations between the Democratic legislature and conservative Republican governor Pete Wilson. As Senate President Pro Tem, Lockyer was a key negotiator in these private negotiations, which, he later recalled to journalist Daniel Weintraub, produced the State's “last... old-fashioned balanced budget,”, linked to a bi-partisan billion-dollar tax "mega-deal", a complex legislative package that cut state income taxes for middle class Californians.

State attorney general
Elected attorney general in 1998 after 25 years as a legislator with a small, close-knit staff, Lockyer took on an executive position that demanded both policy direction and managerial acumen. The Department of Justice, of which he was “chief executive officer”, had some 5,000 employees, 1200 of whom were attorneys handling a caseload of 100,000 lawsuits – the equivalent, in the private sector of the seventh largest law firm in America. Much of the department's effort was as a service agency for the staggering demands of California's local law enforcement – 90,000 officers at 70,000 police terminals expecting split-second response from a state telecommunications network that received three million inquiries a day; background and fingerprints checks of a million annual applicants for positions as police officers, teachers and day-care providers, and “live scan” of another million and a half fingerprints taken during booking arrest, plus searches connected with 750,000 outstanding warrants for wanted suspects. This required Lockyer to radically restructure and reinvigorate his department with high-tech efficiencies and policy innovations to modernize the relationship between the attorney general and the law enforcement community. Having grown up in the Berkeley 'Sixties atmosphere of anti-police rhetoric, Lockyer, now described by the press as the state's "Top Cop", insisted on attending memorial services for more than 50 officers killed in the line of duty during his years in office.

At the same time, Lockyer steered the Justice Department to a new legal activism that reflected his liberal values in such areas of litigation and regulation as civil rights and anti-trust enforcement and consumer and environmental protection. He became one of the two most prominent state Attorneys General in the nation, rivaled in media attention only by New York's Eliot Spitzer. The two men were personal rivals as well, once nearly coming to blows after "screaming expletives at each other" at a Los Angeles convention of the National Association of Attorneys General. That organization elected Lockyer its president in 2003.

As attorney general, Lockyer sometimes had to defend official positions he found objectionable, such as asking the courts, in 2004, to invalidate San Francisco same-sex marriage licenses which conflicted with state law, though he personally supported the right of same-sex marriage  which brought him under fire from both social conservatives and gay activists. On other occasions, the positions Lockyer defended matched his own, as when he defended California's 1996 legalization of medical marijuana against federal attacks by the Bush Administration. Lockyer found this particularly satisfying as he had come to strongly support "compassionate use" of Marijuana after living through his mother's and younger sister's deaths from leukemia.

Sex offenders, DNA testing, bullet coding
In grappling with the sheer size and range of the state's law enforcement responsibilities, Lockyer confronted, with varying success, several challenges that required his department to give new high-technology support to law enforcement agencies.

In 1996, the state legislature had passed California's version of "Megan's Law", which required authorities to make publicly available registration information provided to local police by former child molesters, rapists and others sex offenders after being released from custody. But the public could only access this information about registered sex offenders living in their communities by visiting a police station or calling a 900 toll-line number, until Lockyer's Department, with legislative approval in 2004, launched a public website allowing Internet users, by a simple search, to find personal details about more than 60,000 past sex offenders, and to locate, through an interactive map, such offenders living in their neighborhoods. The website faced initial complaints that, despite the State's efforts to prod local Police to provide accurate data, some of the information was outdated; and that, as the ACLU contended, there were too few restrictions to protect the civil liberties of those who had already completed their sentences. But the website did draw enormous public interest, receiving over 186,000,000 "hits" from more than 16,000,000 individual users in its first year of operation.

Another large-scale bio-tech challenge was expansion of State Crime Lab facilities to process DNA genetic samples taken from convicted felons, aiming to create the largest state-run DNA criminal data-bank in the country. Since 1988, California law had required blood samples taken from felons convicted of specific sex and violent crimes, in the hope of reinvigorating often “cold” investigations of unsolved crimes. When Lockyer took office, 100,000 of these blood samples were sitting in cold storage, still waiting to be analyzed and compared to DNA taken from crime scene evidence. In June 2001, Lockyer announced that with an expanded DNA Lab staff and new equipment, the backlog of unanalyzed blood samples had been entirely eliminated, leading to identification of suspects in homicide cases more than 15 years old.

But then a voter-approved measure of 2004 that allowed police to gather DNA, not just from convicted violent criminals, but from anyone arrested, even without charge or conviction, for any felony, violent or otherwise led Lockyer himself to express reservations. "I personally wouldn't have put arrests in the measure," he said, adding that he would also have made it simpler for innocent people to get their information removed from the files – a complaint of civil libertarians who raised the specter of innocent people being kept in the same database as convicted armed felons. This also proved an administrative nightmare, as the backlog eliminated in 2001 had reappeared as a new backlog of 287,000 by 2006, forcing new efforts, with inadequate financial resources, to meet the television-viewing public's rising expectations of law enforcement efficiency.

After a Seattle company unveiled a new technology for "coding" individual bullets, Lockyer sponsored the first legislation in the country which would have required all handgun (but not rifle) ammunition sold in California to be engraved with a unique serial identification number. "We are losing too many of our young people to seemingly random shootings and anonymous killers," said Lockyer. The bill "will strip criminals of their anonymity and give law enforcement evidence it can use to quickly and effectively solve more gun crimes." The National Rifle Association and other gun rights groups – already at odds with Lockyer over enforcement of State prohibitions against semi-automatic rifles – strongly condemned the plan, saying criminals could easily obtain unmarked ammunition and that the whole process would create a costly enforcement bureaucracy. Manufacturers also opposed the measure as economically disastrous, since the engraving machines would cost up to half a million dollars each and would make virtually obsolete tens of millions of dollars in existing manufacturing equipment. The bill died in the legislature.

2000–01 California energy crisis

Of the many actions taken by Lockyer's staff against corporate fraud and malfeasance, the most prominent were related to the state's energy crisis that began in the summer of 2000, marked by rolling blackouts, brownouts and the billions of dollars in price hikes that appeared on consumers' electrical bills. It later emerged that the "crisis" stemmed in part from illegal practices by energy corporations such as the now-defunct Enron. The exposure of these hidden offenses began in August 2000 when Lockyer created an Energy Task Force to launch the State's first investigation of alleged price gouging by power companies.

The Wall Street Journal scoffed at million-dollar rewards offered by the Attorney General's office for information about illegal conduct by energy powers, dismissing the allegations as unsupported by clear evidence. But such probes eventually led to some five billion dollars in brokered settlements by Enron and a half dozen other corporations which admitted to "gaming" the State's deregulated energy system.

Enron and prison-rape remark controversy
As Attorney General, Lockyer, during the Enron scandal of 2001, achieved some notoriety for his public quip, "I would love to personally escort [Enron CEO] Ken Lay to an 8-by-10 cell that he could share with a tattooed dude who says, 'Hi, my name is Spike, honey'". This remark was widely condemned as an endorsement of prison rape. Lockyer later apologized for the statement in a letter to the Los Angeles Times, saying, "My anger over the activities of energy barons doesn't come close to my lifelong outrage at the crime of rape. ... I guess I let my anger get the better of me in talking about the mercenary corporate executives who are making life so miserable for millions of Californians."

Auto industry global warming lawsuit
On September 20, 2006, Lockyer filed a lawsuit against what his office referred to as "the big six automakers" for their alleged contributions to global warming. Initial reaction was mixed, with some environmental groups being supportive, and an auto industry trade calling it a 'nuisance suit'. A similar suit in New York had been dismissed by a federal court.

The California suit was dismissed on September 17, 2007, with the court saying that "The adjudication of plaintiff's claim would require the court to balance the competing interests of reducing global warming emissions and the interests of advancing and preserving economic and industrial development."

Hewlett-Packard scandal
While Attorney General, in 2006, Lockyer and his staff conducted a criminal investigation into the Hewlett-Packard pretexting scandal to ascertain whether or not the investigators authorized by Chairman Patricia C. Dunn to discover the source of leaks from within the company illegally obtained the phone records of HP board members and journalists. Charges were subsequently brought against Dunn, which were dismissed by the court in 2007 (while Dunn was battling terminal cancer) in the "interests of justice".

Landmark legal cases
Silveira v. Lockyer (Restrictions on semi-automatic firearms)
Lockyer v. Andrade ("Three-strikes" criminal sentencing)
Lockyer v. City and County of San Francisco (Same-sex Marriage)

2003 gubernatorial recall election

An initiative to recall newly re-elected Governor Gray Davis qualified for the ballot in July 2003, with a special election, scheduled for October, to include both a referendum on the recall itself and a list of candidates vying to replace Davis if the recall succeeded. With some arm-twisting by U.S. Senator Dianne Feinstein, all the potential Democratic candidates, including Lockyer, agreed not to run, in the hope that this would strengthen Davis' campaign to defeat the recall.

At the start, it appeared that the strongest Republican candidate would be former Los Angeles Mayor Richard Riordan, who had unsuccessfully sought the Republican nomination for governor the previous year. Lockyer, at the start of August, publicly warned Davis and his political consultants against a repeat effort to sabotage Riordan's candidacy by negative attack ads: "If they do the trashy campaign on Dick Riordan ... I think there are going to be prominent Democrats that will defect and just say, 'We're tired of that puke politics. Don't you dare do it again or we're just going to help pull the plug.'"

Five days later, Arnold Schwarzenegger announced that he would run as a Republican in the recall election. Lockyer and Schwarzenegger had been casual friends since Lockyer's state senate years, when the actor had chaired the Governor's Council on Physical Fitness and Sports, and the two men had together toured charter schools in southern California. Later, Lt. Governor Cruz Bustamante announced he would become the only prominent Democrat to place his name on the recall ballot.

On October 7, by a decisive vote, Davis was recalled, and Schwarzenegger was elected to replace him. Two weeks later, at a UC Berkeley post-mortem conference on the election, Lockyer made the surprise announcement that while he had voted against the recall, he had also voted for Schwarzenegger, the first time he had ever voted for a Republican in a state election. He explained that he was "tired of transactional, cynical, deal-making politics," and that, for him, "Arnold represented... hope, change, reform, opportunity, upbeat problem solving". He added, "I hope I haven't been conned". Many fellow Democrats and feminists reacted bitterly to Lockyer's surprise announcement, which proved damaging to his future political aspirations.

State treasurer

2006 election

By a year into Schwarzenegger's governorship, Lockyer increasingly felt the Governor's performance was disheartening, marked by inexperience, lack of strong political conviction, and personal braggadocio. In a 2005 interview, Lockyer criticized Schwarzenegger's leadership style as demonstrating an "arrogance of power" with the "odor of Austrian politics", alluding to the Austrian-born Governor's upbringing in a country with a "long history" of "elite...autocracy".

Soon after the recall election, Lockyer, barred by term limits from seeking a third term as attorney general, began contemplating his own run for governor in the 2006 election. In January 2005, he tentatively announced his candidacy for governor: "the one and only office that has held abiding interest for me since I left the Legislature ... It's the job I want, not only because I think I'll be a great executive, but because I think that I can and will lead the best campaign you've ever seen, a winning Democratic campaign of ideas, ideals and inspiration to stake out a great future for California." Lockyer changed his mind four months later, saying that while he felt strongly about the need to improve education and transportation, and to address "the growing disparity" between the state's rich and poor, he was unwilling "to spend the next 10 years of my life" in the daily "partisan fighting" that plagued governors of both parties. In June 2005, he announced he would instead run for state treasurer. He was elected to that office in November 2006.

Climate change and renewable energy finance initiatives
As treasurer (and ex officio trustee of CalPERS and CalSTRS, the two largest public employee pension funds in the United States) Lockyer tried to use the influence of his office in the aid of various environmental causes. These attempts included:

 Expanding the "Green Wave" environmental initiative first proposed by Treasurer Phil Angelides in 2004 to a multibillion-dollar investment in renewable energy
 With statutory authority of the Treasurer's California Alternative Energy and Advanced Transportation Financing Authority (CAEATFA), exempting new "Zero Emission Vehicle" manufacturers, such as electric automobile startup Tesla Motors, from sales and use tax on the purchase of equipment used in California manufacturing.
 State purchase – the first by any governmental body in the US – of "Green Bonds" issued by the World Bank to finance Climate Change projects in developing countries
 Providing a $48 million loan guarantee program to help California truckers comply with new diesel emission regulations put into force by the California Air Resources Board

Based on such state programs, Lockyer also sponsored federal legislation (H.R.3525,“Private Activity Bonds for Clean Energy Projects”) introduced in July 2009 by California Congressman Mike Thompson to provide tax-exempt bond financing nationally for private sector Renewable Energy projects, Zero-emission vehicle purchases, and "green" manufacturing facilities.

2008–09 California budget crisis
In the fall of 2008, with the economy faltering, the legislature very belatedly passed what Los Angeles Times political columnist George Skelton called "another atrocious, short-sighted, gimmicky budget that set a record for procrastination" and "wreaked havoc all across California among small business vendors, healthcare centers and nursing homes that couldn't be paid by the state until a budget was enacted."

Lockyer was also critical of the budget, describing its budgetary provisions to Skelton as "banana republic financing", based on accounting gimmicks (that "give gimmicks a bad name"), "phony inflated estimates of revenue" and a "boondoggle" of "massive" corporate tax breaks at a time of mounting State deficit.

In 2009, it was discovered that the state faced a $25 billion deficit, following a sharp drop in tax revenues.

As negotiations began to revise the state budget, Lockyer tried to convince U.S. Treasury Secretary Timothy Geithner to provide a guarantee for state bond payments. "A fiscal meltdown by California ... would surely destabilize the U.S., if not worldwide financial markets," Lockyer wrote to Geithner on May 13. The Obama Administration declined the request.

Earlier, Lockyer warned the legislative conference committee that private lenders would be leery of any more "smoke-and-mirrors accounting tricks" and that lawmakers would have to rely heavily on spending cuts to balance the budget: "It seems to me that the kind of budget we will require before the end of June is almost entirely  cuts ... My suggestion to you is don't delay the pain. It's going to be awful, but just get it done. It's going to be worse if it doesn't get done."

Lockyer was also quoted as telling Democratic legislators that, "fair or not", angry voters blamed them for "12 years of flowing red ink". "Why don't you start with the realization that probably none of you are going to be back here next year?", after the 2010 elections. "You're not going to get reelected. Just put the politics out of your brain ... That's a very liberating thought, and with it you can get a lot done."

When the legislature failed to pass a balanced budget before the start of the new fiscal year on July 1, 2009, State Controller John Chiang began issuing IOUs to some state creditors. Lockyer suggested having a respected intermediary mediate between the Republican governor and the Democratic-controlled legislature. Republican State Senator Bob Huff scoffed at the idea, saying, "No caucus is going to go with that... I'm not going to vote for new taxes just because some mediator told me to."

Throughout the budget crisis, Lockyer warned that an impasse would increasingly raise the costs of short-and long-term state borrowing, ultimately as much as an additional $7.5 billion in interest over the next 30 years. On July 6, with no budget agreement yet concluded, Fitch Ratings downgraded California's bond rating to BBB, just one notch above the dividing line between investment grade and speculative grade "junk" bonds. A Lockyer spokesman estimated that this downgrade alone would represent an immediate "hit of hundreds of millions of dollars" in higher credit costs.

As California continued to issue IOUs to cover $350 million in short-term debt, the formal standing of California bonds continued to decline. Moody's joined Fitch in cutting the State's debt rating (though still three levels above "junk" status), because of "increasing" risk to debt service payments. And a London firm which tracks speculative "credit default swaps" ranked California ninth in the world among the 10 governmental entities most likely to default on their financial obligations. A Lockyer spokesman called this assessment "ludicrous", and Lockyer himself continued to insist, as he had done throughout the crisis, that the threat of default was "infinitesimally small... short of a thermonuclear war."

Two days later, on July 16, Lockyer stated, “I call on the Governor and Legislature to focus exclusively on what it takes to bring this year’s budget back in balance, honestly and immediately. I urge them to...quit adding or resurrecting endless ideological debating points, and to stop using budget negotiations to score points with political allies or against partisan opponents." He added that the state's credit rating was moving "closer and closer to the junk pile... If our credit rating sinks to junk status, the state will find the door to the infrastructure bond market locked shut".

One Democratic insider stated that by this "tongue-lashing of legislative leaders", the "ever-blunt" Lockyer "didn't win...any friends in the Capitol".

Four days after Lockyer's remarks, the Governor and legislative leaders finally announced they had reached agreement on a complex budget plan which combined spending cuts with various accounting maneuvers.

A month later, Standard and Poor's removed California bonds from its "credit watch list", indicating that while the bonds still had a negative outlook, they were not "under threat of an imminent downgrade". Lockyer was optimistic about this "positive development ... It reflects confidence that the budget solution adopted by the governor and legislature gets us on the right track..."

2010 Tesla, Toyota and NUMMI Electric Auto Partnership
When the Toyota corporation announced it would close the NUMMI auto plant in Fremont, California, after its long-time partner in the facility, General Motors, pulled out of the partnership, Lockyer appointed a blue-ribbon commission that publicized the adverse economic consequences of plant closure and the unemployment of several thousand workers, and pleaded with Toyota to reconsider. The company refused.

But then Lockyer, working behind the scenes, helped arrange a new partnership at the NUMMI plant between Toyota and Tesla Motors, an electric car company, which he had assisted in the past through the Treasurer's "Green Wave" investment policies.

2010 election

Three of Lockyer's predecessors as state treasurer – Jesse Unruh, Kathleen Brown, and Phil Angelides – had lost gubernatorial campaigns, and Democratic pundits considered the treasurer's job a much "smaller bully pulpit" which did not provide a good springboard to higher office.

Despite persistent rumors that Lockyer, who had earlier accumulated a $10 million political war chest, might be a "dark horse" possibility for governor in 2010, he expressed no interest in mounting a campaign to succeed Schwarzenegger. When asked about the possibility, Lockyer stated that he saw no chance of winning a primary election battle with former governor Jerry Brown (his successor as attorney general), who eventually emerged as the unchallenged Democratic nominee and went on to win the general election. Lockyer also said he preferred spending time with his family. "You kill yourself being a Governor", he joked, "and then maybe you get a new aqueduct named after you".

In an article probing Schwarzenegger's political unpopularity in his final months in office, George Skelton, after quoting Lockyer's reflection on the fickle electorate ("Our state voters have very high expectations of what government can do. And their haste to criticize is very high") opined that Lockyer "might have been governor himself if he were more ambitious and photogenic, and sometimes less blunt".

Having faced no opposition in the Democratic primary, Lockyer, using the attention-getting campaign slogan, "Straight Talk, No Bull#*+!" was re-elected for a final term as state treasurer in the November 2010 election, defeating a Republican state senator from Orange County, Mimi Walters, and receiving more votes that year than any elected official in the United States. He was endorsed by the Sacramento Bee, Oakland Tribune, San Francisco Chronicle, Los Angeles Times, and the San Jose Mercury News, which concluded that "the Hayward Democrat has done well at a number of jobs over several decades, from the Legislature to attorney general. But as state treasurer for the past four years, he has really shone, maturing to near-statesman stature..."

Retirement from public office
In 2012, Lockyer was seriously considered for chancellor of the California State University system, but the position went instead to a professional educational administrator. Then, unable to run for a third term as treasurer due to term limits, he expressed a tentative interest in running for state controller in 2014, but instead announced his retirement from elected office.  He is now Of Counsel to the Boston-based international law firm, Brown Rudnick, advising clients in the firm's Orange County office on government law and strategies.

See also
1998 California Attorney General election
2002 California Attorney General election

References

External links
 California State Treasurer Bill Lockyer Official state site
 Bill Lockyer for state treasurer Official campaign site
 Follow the Money – Bill Lockyer 2006 campaign contributions

Join California Bill Lockyer

|-

|-

1941 births
California Attorneys General
Democratic Party California state senators
Living people
McGeorge School of Law alumni
Democratic Party members of the California State Assembly
People from Hayward, California
State treasurers of California
University of California, Berkeley alumni
20th-century American politicians